Gregorio Martínez Sacristán' (19 December 1946 – 20 September 2019) was a Spanish Roman Catholic bishop.

Martínez Sacristán was born in Villarejo de Salvanés, Spain and was ordained to the priesthood in 1971. He served as bishop of the Roman Catholic Diocese of Zamora in Spain from 2006 until his death in 2019.

Notes

1946 births
2019 deaths
Bishops of Zamora
Bishops appointed by Pope Benedict XVI
21st-century Roman Catholic bishops in Spain